Warren Foote (1817–1903) was a Mormon pioneer and settler. He was captain of a company which crossed the plains from Council Bluffs, Iowa, arriving in the Salt Lake Valley in September 1850.

Foote was born in upstate New York. While he was living there in 1833 his father joined the LDS Church. Foote did not join the Church at that time but did travel with his father to Kirtland, Ohio. He later went with the Latter-day Saints to Missouri and Illinois. In 1842 Foote was baptized at Nauvoo, Illinois.

After coming to Utah Foote lived in Union in the Salt Lake valley in what is today Midvale, Utah.

In the 1860s, Foote was one of the original settlers of St. Joseph, Nevada, and an early settler of Glendale, Utah. He was a critic of the Mountain Meadows Massacre.

After moving to Glendale Foote served as a member of the Kanab Stake High Council. He was stake patriarch of the Kanab Stake at the time of his death.

Notes

1817 births
1903 deaths
Mormon pioneers
Latter Day Saints from Utah
Latter Day Saints from Nevada
Converts to Mormonism
Latter Day Saints from Illinois